Alban Ajdini (born 9 July 1999) is a professional footballer who plays as a winger for Swiss club Lausanne Ouchy. Born in Switzerland, he represents Kosovo at international level.

Club career

Servette
On 5 June 2020, Ajdini signed his first professional contract with Swiss Super League side Servette after agreeing to a two-year deal. On 19 July 2020, he made his debut in a 2–2 home draw against Basel after coming on as a substitute at 85th minute in place of Alex Schalk.

Loan at Lausanne Ouchy
On 11 January 2021, Ajdini joined Swiss Challenge League side Lausanne Ouchy, on a six-month-long loan, and received squad number 17.

International career
On 2 October 2020, Ajdini received a call-up from Kosovo U21 for 2021 UEFA European Under-21 Championship qualification matches against Austria U21 and Andorra U21. Seven days later, he made his debut with Kosovo U21 in a match against Austria U21 after being named in the starting line-up.

Career statistics

Club

References

External links

1999 births
Living people
Footballers from Geneva
Kosovan footballers
Swiss men's footballers
Swiss people of Kosovan descent
Kosovo youth international footballers
Kosovo under-21 international footballers
Kosovan expatriate footballers
Kosovan expatriate sportspeople in Switzerland
Association football wingers
Swiss Super League players
Servette FC players
Swiss Challenge League players
FC Stade Lausanne Ouchy players